Ilione albiseta is a species of fly in the family Sciomyzidae. It is found in the  Palearctic . The larva preys on Galba truncatula

References

External links
Images representing Ilione albiseta at BOLD

Sciomyzidae
Insects described in 1763
Muscomorph flies of Europe
Taxa named by Giovanni Antonio Scopoli